The 72nd District of the Iowa House of Representatives in the state of Iowa.

Current elected officials
Dean Fisher is the representative currently representing the district.

Past representatives
The district has previously been represented by:
 Howard A. Hamilton, 1971–1973
 Rayman D. Logue, 1973–1975
 Linda Svoboda, 1975–1979
 Phillip Tyrrell, 1979–1983
 Thomas E. Swartz, 1983–1991
 Gordon Burke, 1991–1993
 Jack Holveck, 1993–2001
 Janet Petersen, 2001–2003
 Rich Arnold, 2003–2013
 Dean Fisher, 2013–present

References

072